The International Film Festival Kyrgyzstan - Land of Short Films is an annual film festival held to celebrate short films from the former Soviet Union. The 5th Annual International Film Festival Kyrgyzstan - Land of Short Films will be held December 12 to December 15, 2015 in Bishkek, Kyrgyz Republic.

History

In 2011, Kyrgyzstan - Land of Short Films was founded by director, producer, and public figure, Sadyk Sher-Niyaz. Each year the Festival is held by Public Aitysh Public Fund, Aitysh Film, and the Union of Filmmakers of the Kyrgyz Republic from December 12 - December 15. The Festival Opening marks the birthday of the famous Kyrgyz writer Chingiz Aitmatov. The Festival was founded by Public Aitysh Public Fund, Aitysh Film, and the Cinematographers Union of Kyrgyzstan. Each year the Festival is held at the Manas Cinema Hall in Bishkek, Kyrgyzstan. The official language of the Film Festival is Russian. The Festival accepts all short films (including documentary, animations, and live action) from the former Soviet Union, including the Republic of Georgia and the Baltic states.

Mission

The festival devoted to memory of the great writer Chingiz Aitmatov, sets as the purpose:
-  to support of short films
-  to develop the formation of its high welfare status and traditional values
-  to continue the preservation of uniform cinema space of CIS countries, Baltic states and Georgia
-  to promote development of creative contacts between cinematographers.

Program and Juries

The Festival includes two programs—International and National Competition.

Each year the Festival invites 5 Jury Members well-known throughout the former Soviet Union to participate in the Festival Programs. Past jury members have included George Ovashvili and Khodjakuli Narliev.

Awards

The Festival Jury selects the final awards for the International and National competitions in the following categories:

Best Film
Best Director
Special Jury Prize
Audience Award

The Festival awards cash prizes for the winners in the total amount of 500,000 Kyrgyz som.

References

Short film festivals
Film festivals in Kyrgyzstan
Entertainment events in Kyrgyzstan
Culture in Bishkek